Jarmo Hirvasoja (born 4 September 1954) is a former international speedway rider from Finland.

Speedway career 
Hirvasoja became a world champion after winning the gold medal at the Individual Ice Speedway World Championship in the 1990 Individual Ice Speedway World Championship.

In addition he won a silver medal in 1985 and two medals at the Team Ice Racing World Championship.

World final appearances

Ice World Championship
1984  Moscow, 7th 16pts 
1985  Assen, 2nd 26pts
1986  Stockholm, 8th 13pts 
1988  Eindhoven, 14th
1989  Almaty, 12th 9pts
1990  Göteborg, champion 27pts
1993  Saransk, 7th 17pts
1994 10 Rounds GP, 9th
1995 10 Rounds GP, 14th

References 

1954 births
Living people
Finnish speedway riders
Sportspeople from Oulu